Kim Young-kwang (born 20 June 1987) is a South Korean football player, who is currently playing for Lamphun Warrior F.C.

References

1987 births
Living people
South Korean footballers
South Korean expatriate footballers
Suwon FC players
K League 1 players
Korea National League players
Liga 1 (Indonesia) players
Expatriate footballers in Singapore
Expatriate footballers in Thailand
Expatriate footballers in Indonesia
South Korean expatriate sportspeople in Indonesia
Association football forwards